Judo at the 2011 Pacific Games was held on 6–8 September at Nouméa in New Caledonia.

Medal summary

Medal table

Men

Women

References

Judo at the 2011 Pacific Games

2011 Pacific Games
Pacific Games
2011